Regret (April 2, 1912 – April 11, 1934) was a famous American thoroughbred racemare and the first of three female horses to ever win the Kentucky Derby.

Background
She was foaled at Harry Payne Whitney's Brookdale Farm in Lincroft, New Jersey.  The filly was sired by Broomstick, the 1913-1915 leading sire inducted into the National Museum of Racing and Hall of Fame (son of Ben Brush, also inducted into the Hall of Fame).  She was out of Jersey Lightning, who goes back to Longfellow through his Kentucky Derby-winning son, Riley.  Regret was bred by owner Harry Payne Whitney.

Racing career
Trained by James G. Rowe, Sr., in 1914 Regret became the first of only four horses to ever win all three Saratoga Race Course events for two-year-olds: the Saratoga Special Stakes, Sanford Stakes and Hopeful Stakes. Joining her would be Campfire (1916), Dehere (1993), and City Zip (2000).  The following year, campaigning as a three-year-old, she won the 1915 Kentucky Derby, her first race as a three-year-old, and became the first filly of three to do so. Regret was also the first undefeated horse to win the Kentucky Derby, and had only three starts prior to the race (matched by Big Brown in 2008). Regret was retrospectively named American Horse of the Year.

1915 was the year of the Triple Crown fillies, as Rhine Maiden won the Preakness Stakes. Regret's owner had not entered her in that race. Not since 1915 has more than one Triple Crown race a year been won by a filly.

Retirement
After the 1917 racing season, Regret was retired for breeding to the new Whitney farm in Lexington, Kentucky. In this last season, she raced in the Brooklyn Handicap against the best of her generation: Old Rosebud, Roamer, Omar Khayyam (winner of the 1917 Kentucky Derby), Boots, Ormsdale and Chiclet.  In the final strides, she was defeated by a nose by her stablemate, Borrow, giving away 5 pounds.

Out of 11 starts in four seasons (1914–1917), Regret won nine, and placed second in one.  The only race she was not placed in was the 1916 Saratoga Handicap.  Throughout her career, she was never beaten by a female horse.

As a broodmare, she produced only one major stakes winner, Revenge, out of eleven foals. She died in 1934, aged 22, and was buried at the Whitney farm in Lexington.

Assessment and honors
Regret was inducted into the National Museum of Racing and Hall of Fame in 1957.  In the Blood-Horse magazine ranking of the top 100 U.S. thoroughbred champions of the 20th Century, she was #71. (Roamer ranks 99th, Old Rosebud, 88th.)

In a poll among members of the American Trainers Association, conducted in 1955 by Delaware Park Racetrack, Regret was voted the third-greatest filly in American racing history.  Gallorette was voted first.

Pedigree

See also
 List of historical horses

Notes

References
 Regret's pedigree, Pedigree Query
 Regret's Derby, Kentucky Derby Website
 "Regret", U.S. Hall of Fame
 "James G. Rowe", U.S. Hall of Fame
 Staff and Correspondents of The Blood-Horse magazine, Women of the Year - Ten Fillies Who Achieved Horse Racing's Highest Honor, (2004) Eclipse Press

External links
 

1912 racehorse births
1934 racehorse deaths
Racehorses trained in the United States
Racehorses bred in New Jersey
American Champion racehorses
United States Thoroughbred Racing Hall of Fame inductees
Kentucky Derby winners
Whitney racehorses
Thoroughbred family A1